Daniel Smith (born 17 August 1982) is an English footballer who played in The Football League for Bournemouth and last played for Winchester City.

References

1982 births
Living people
Footballers from Southampton
Association football defenders
English footballers
Bashley F.C. players
AFC Bournemouth players
Winchester City F.C. players
Eastleigh F.C. players
Bognor Regis Town F.C. players
Gosport Borough F.C. players
English Football League players